This is a list of Billboard magazine's ranking of the year's top country and western singles of 1961.

Patsy Cline's "I Fall to Pieces" ranked as the year's No. 1 country and western record. It was released in January 1961, entered the Top 40 on Billboards country and western chart on April 3, and spent a total of 39 weeks on the chart.

George Jones had two records that finished in the year's Top 5 records: "The Window Up Above" spent 34 weeks on the chart and ranked No. 3 on the year-end chart; and "Tender Years" spent 32 weeks on the chart and ranked No. 4 for the year.

Webb Pierce and Buck Owens led all other artists, each having four records on the year-end list.

Three labels, Capitol, Decca, and RCA Victor, each had 11 records finish on the year-end list. Columbia had seven, and Mercury five.

See also
List of Hot C&W Sides number ones of 1961
List of Billboard Hot 100 number ones of 1961
1961 in country music

Notes

References

1961 record charts
Billboard charts
1961 in American music